Miranda is a BBC television series co-written by and starring comedian Miranda Hart. It first aired on BBC Two on 9 November 2009 and has since moved to BBC One. The situation comedy also features Sarah Hadland, Tom Ellis, Patricia Hodge and Sally Phillips. The series is based on Hart's semi-autobiographical writing and followed a television pilot and the BBC Radio 2 comedy Miranda Hart's Joke Shop.

Series overview

Episodes

Series 1 (2009)

Series 2 (2010)

Series 3 (2012–13)
Miranda was recommissioned for a third series by BBC Comedy commissioner Cheryl Taylor in January 2011. It was later confirmed that the third series would be broadcast from 26 December 2012. The series consists of six episodes.

Specials (2014–15)

Comic and Sport Relief Specials

Miranda: My Such Fun Celebration (2020)
To mark the 10th anniversary of the start of the show, the cast were recorded at the London Palladium in 2019 celebrating and commemorating the series. Hart announced the special on Twitter while stressing that it would not be a new episode. The 70-minute programme Miranda: My Such Fun Celebration was broadcast on BBC One on 1 January 2020.

References

External links
Miranda BBC Episode Guide

Lists of British sitcom episodes